Kvinnliga IK Sport is a sports club in Gothenburg, Sweden, which just as the name says only runs women's activity. Since the late 1970s, men are however allowed to be board members. While nowadays only running handball activity, winning 14 Swedish national indoor championship titles between 1951 and 1972 (1951, 1952, 1953, 1954, 1955, 1957, 1958, 1959, 1960, 1961, 1964, 1969, 1971 and 1972), it earlier even ran cycling, gymnastics, track and field athletics, speedskating and orienteering.

References

External links
 Official website 

1927 establishments in Sweden
Sports clubs established in 1927
Swedish handball clubs
Sports clubs in Gothenburg
Athletics clubs in Sweden
Orienteering clubs in Sweden
Women's sport in Sweden
Multi-sport clubs in Sweden